The 1893 Championship of Australia was an Australian rules football match that took place on 7 October 1893.

The championship was contested by the premiers of the VFA, Essendon and the premiers of the SAFA, South Adelaide.

The match was played at Victoria Park in Melbourne, Victoria.

The match, played in front of 12,000, was won by Essendon by a margin of 7 goals, giving Essendon its 1st Championship of Australia Title.

This was the last Championship of Australia match to be held until 1907.

Match details

References 

Championship of Australia
1893 in Australian sport
Championship of Australia
October 1893 sports events